Robert E. "Bob" Westfield (26 May 1907 – 7 June 1970) was a New Zealand-born rugby union player who represented Australia.

Westfield, a fullback, was born in Hunterville and claimed a total of 6 international rugby caps for Australia.

References

Australian rugby union players
Australia international rugby union players
1907 births
1970 deaths
People from Hunterville
Rugby union players from Manawatū-Whanganui
Rugby union fullbacks